Horki or Gorki is a town in Mogilev Region, Belarus, and the administrative center of Horki District. As of 2009, its population was 32,777.

History
For the first time Horki was mentioned in written sources ("The Lithuanian Chronicles") in 1544 as a village. First known owner was prince Drucki-Horski. Since 1584 Horki was owned by the Sapieha family. Kazimierz Leon Sapieha founded a new Catholic church in Horki, fulfilling the will of his father Lew Sapieha. In the 17th century the village became the center for Hory-Horki estate. Until the 19th century it was called Hory. Three markets plus annual fairs were held in Horki. In 1683 there were 510 houses and 2 service land holdings: “Kazimirovskaya Slaboda” and “Zarechye.” Administratively it was located in the Orsza County in Vitebsk Voivodeship in the Grand Duchy of Lithuania in the Polish–Lithuanian Commonwealth. During the Great Northern War Tsar Peter I of Russia stayed in Horki from July 9 to August 16, 1708.

Horki was annexed by the Russian Empire in 1772 in the course of the First Partition of Poland. Decree of the Ruling Senate on October 23, 1772 Mogilev Province was divided into four provinces - Mogilev, Mstislav, Rogachev and Orsha. Horki and surrounding areas were included in the Orsha province, and from 1777 - in Orsha district, and then Kopyssky district.

In 1840 the Horki Agricultural School was opened, and in 1848 it was transformed into the Horki Agricultural Institute. From this time Horki became the center of agricultural education in the territory of present-day Belarus. Opening of agricultural institutions contributed to the economic development of the Horki. Thus, in 1859 began working iron foundry, opened a post office (1840), pharmacy (1840), the meteorological station (1841).

On December 26, 1861 Tsarist government ordered to change status of village to status of town.

During the January Uprising, on May 6, 1863, it was the site of a battle between Polish insurgents and Russian troops, won by the Poles. In 1864, the Agricultural Institute was moved to Saint Petersburg, leaving only the agricultural and taxation schools in Horki.

State peasants, who lived in Horki, had the right to remain in the same class or go to the category of lower middle class. At the same time they would depart their land to the Ministry of State Property. For the conduct of municipal services and judicial affairs was created Horki City Council. The following year, in the Horki from Kopyss were transferred the court, district treasury, post office, city hospital, military command and other institutions. 
In August 1867 had approved the provision of arms of the city Horki: "... to portray in this coat of arms, as the main emblem of the city Horki, three hills, the middle higher than others, and to indicate the occupation of farming population of the city – wheat plants growing out of the tips of the hills, in the top part of the coat of arms to put Mogilev province coat of arms and decorate the tower with three prongs."

Coat of Horki and Horki district is part of the historical and heraldic monuments of Belarus. The flag is based on the stamp image. The artist was V. A. Lyahor.

During World War II, Horki was under German occupation from 12 July 1941 until 26 June 1944.

Current emblem and flag of the city approved by Presidential Decree 24 August 2006 № 526 "On establishing the official heraldic symbols of administrative and territorial units of Mogilev region."

Industry 
OJSC "Milk Gorki"
JSC "Gorkilen"
GLHU "Goretsky forestry"
OJSC "Prema"
Peat is mined
RUPP "Mogilevkhlebprom" branch "Goretsky bakery"
GUKDSP "Goretskaya Specialized Mobile Mechanized Column"
CHPP "Prometheus"
Gorki Raipo

Transport

Railway
Pogodino railway station (on the Orsha-Krichev line). There are trains of interregional economy class lines Krichev-Baranovichi, Baranovichi-Krichev.

Automobile transport
There is a bus station. Regular buses and fixed-route taxis go to Minsk, Vitebsk, Mogilev, Gomel, Orsha, Mstislavl, settlements of the Gorki district. The city is crossed by highways of republican significance R-70 (Mogilev-Lenino), R-15 (Lepel-Krichev), R-123 (Mostok-Dribin-Gorki).

Museums

Horki Historical and Ethnographic Museum (Krupskaya st., 3)
Museum of the Belarusian State Agricultural Academy (Palace of Culture of the Academy)
Museum-office of Maxim Goretsky (building No. 4 of the Belarusian State Agricultural Academy)

Notable residents 

 Raphael Kalinowski (1835–1907), Polish Discalced Carmelite friar, insurgent, teacher, engineer, Catholic saint, student of the Horki Agricultural Institute
 Lev Razgon (1908–1999), journalist and writer, prisoner of the Gulag and a human rights activist
 Sergei Tikhanovsky (1978),  dissident and pro-democracy activist who is considered by Amnesty International to be a political prisoner and a prisoner of conscience

References

External links

 Site of everyday news of Horki region
 More information about Horki in Belarusian
 Horki news in English
 Photos on Radzima.org
 Horki.BY
 

Towns in Belarus
Populated places in Mogilev Region
Horki District
Vitebsk Voivodeship
Goretsky Uyezd